Edison Néstor Maldonado Villalba (born 7 June 1972, in Quito) is a retired Ecuadorian football forward.

International career
He was a member of the Ecuador national football team at the 1997 Copa América, and obtained a total number of ten caps during his career.

References

External links

1972 births
Living people
Footballers from Quito
Association football forwards
Ecuadorian footballers
Ecuador international footballers
1997 Copa América players
S.D. Aucas footballers
Barcelona S.C. footballers
Club Blooming players
C.D. El Nacional footballers
C.D. Olmedo footballers
S.D. Quito footballers
Ecuadorian expatriate footballers
Expatriate footballers in Bolivia
Ecuadorian expatriate sportspeople in Bolivia